"Promises" is a song by Polish singer Basia from her debut studio album Time and Tide, released in 1987. The track was written by Basia Trzetrzelewska, Danny White, and Peter Ross of Immaculate Fools. It was produced by Danny and Basia, and is a samba-influenced jazz-pop song. The single was first a minor hit in the UK in January 1988. In 1989, "Promises" charted in the USA, where remixes of the song by Justin Strauss were released on a 12" maxi single.

Music videos
The first music video for the song pictures Basia on a balcony in the middle of a three-storey building, with shadows of the building's inhabitants showing in the windows. She performs the song as the residents go about their everyday lives.

The second clip was filmed in 1989 by Crescenzo Notarile and is a performance music video. It pictures Basia performing the song accompanied by a band and dancers, with a colorful wall painting in the background. This version was included on the VHS/LaserDisc release A New Day in 1990.

Track listings

7" single
A. "Promises" – 3:57
B. "Promises" (Instrumental) – 3:48

7" single
A. "Promises"
B. "Give Me That"

7" single
A. "Promises" – 4:03
B. "From Now On" – 3:46

12" single
A. "Promises" (Extended Remix) – 5:29
B. "From Now On" (Band Version) – 4:05

12" single
A. "Promises" (Extended French Mix)
B1. "Give Me That"
B2. "From Now On"

12" single
A1. "Promises" (Justin Strauss Remix) – 7:12
A2. "Promises" (Just Right Dub) – 7:44
B1. "Promises" (Samba House Mix) – 4:02
B2. "Promises" (Deep Dub) – 5:57

CD maxi single
 "Promises" (Extended French Mix) – 5:32
 "Give Me That" – 4:24
 "Astrud" – 4:39
 "From Now On" (Band Version) – 4:06

Charts

Cover versions
 Gloria Lasso released a Spanish language version on her self-titled 1989 album.
 In 2006, Julie Dexter released a cover of the song on her album Moon Bossa, a collaboration with Khari Simmons.

References

External links
 The official Basia website

1987 singles
1987 songs
Basia songs
Epic Records singles
Samba songs
Songs written by Danny White (musician)
Songs written by Basia